Uhlorchestia uhleri is a species of beach hopper in the family Talitridae.

References

Further reading

 

Amphipoda
Articles created by Qbugbot
Crustaceans described in 1930